Heavy Petting, also known as Don't Knock the Baldhead, is the eighth studio album by British 2 tone and ska band Bad Manners, released on 4 November 1997. Originally released as Don't Knock The Baldhead! in Germany on Pork Pie Records, the album was also released as Heavy Petting in the U.S.A. (Moon Ska Records), Japan (Tachyon International) and Spain (Tralla Records). The album eventually got its first UK release in 2013 on Cherry Red Records.

Track listing

 All songs by Bad Manners unless noted.

 "Don't Knock the Baldheads" (Copyright Control)
 "Black Night" (Ritchie Blackmore)
 "Down Berry Wood"
 "Happiness"
 "Heavy Petting"
 "In the Jungle"
 "No, No, No"
 "Randy Scouse Git" (Micky Dolenz)
 "Feel Like Jumping" (Marcia Griffiths)
 "Red River Ska" (Copyright Control)
 "Liverpool and Birmingham"
 "Lager Delirium"
 "Go"

Personnel

Buster Bloodvessel – Lead Vocals & Production
Louis Alphonso – Guitar, Keyboards, Production & Backing Vocals
Alan Perry – Alto Saxophone & Backing Vocals
John Thompson – Bass
Richard "Bosky" Allen – Keyboards
Matt Godwin – Saxophone
Dave Welton – Trombone
Chris Welch – Trumpet
Phil Baptiste – Drums
Dave Turner – Harmonica
Warren Middleton – Additional Trombone
John Dutton – Additional Keyboards
John Gale – Additional Alto Saxophone
Trevor Swift – Additional Tenor Saxophone
Jason Richardson – Additional Tenor Saxophone
Dan Farrant – Additional Drums
Jacquie & Pauline Cuff – Female Backing Vocals
Marcus D. Bush – Bass, Organ, Production, Engineer & Mixing ( 811 Studios / Sussex / UK )
Glover – Mixing ( 811 Studios / Sussex / UK )
Stefan Bruggemann : Mastering ( Vielklang Studios / Berlin / Germany )
Roger Lomas – Production ( on Feel Like Jumpin' )
Recorded at 811 Studios, Cowfold, Sussex

References

Discogs entry

1997 albums
Bad Manners albums